Gang Hua (born 1979) is a Chinese-American computer scientist who specializes in the field of computer vision and pattern recognition. He is an IEEE Fellow, IAPR Fellow and ACM Distinguished Scientist. He is a key contributor to Microsoft's Facial Recognition technologies.

Biography
Gang Hua is the Vice President and Chief Scientist of Wormpex AI Research. His research focuses on computer vision, pattern recognition, machine learning, robotics, towards general Artificial Intelligence, with primary applications in cloud and edge intelligence, and currently with a focus on new retail intelligence.

Before that, he served in various roles at Microsoft (2015–18) as the science/technical adviser to the CVP of the Computer Vision Group, director of Computer Vision Science Team in Redmond and Taipei ATL, and principal researcher/research manager at Microsoft Research. He was an associate professor in Computer Science at Stevens Institute of Technology (2011–15). During 2014-15, he took an on leave and worked at Amazon (company) on the Amazon-Go project. He was an visiting researcher (2011–14) and a research staff member (2010–11) at IBM Thomas J. Watson Research Center, a senior researcher (2009–10) at Nokia Research Center Hollywood, and a scientist (2006–09) at Microsoft Live Labs.

He received his Ph.D. degree in Electrical Engineering and Computer Engineering from Northwestern University in 2006. He received his M.S. degree in Pattern Recognition and Intelligent System in 2002 and B.S. degree in Control Engineering and Science in 1999, both from Xi'an Jiaotong University. In 1994, he was selected to the Special Class for Gifted Young in Xi'an Jiaotong University.

Services
He is a general chair for IEEE/CVF International Conference on Computer Vision 2025. He is a program chair for IEEE/CVF Conference on Computer Vision and Pattern Recognition 2019  and 2022.

He is also a member of the editorial board of International Journal of Computer Vision, an associate editor-in-chief for Computer Vision and Image Understanding, and an associate editor for IAPR Journal of Machine Vision and Applications. He was an associate rditor for IEEE Transactions on Image Processing for two terms (2012–2015, 2017–2019) and IEEE Transactions on Circuit Systems and Video Technologies (2015–2019), and Vision and View Department editor for IEEE MultiMedia Magazine (2011–2016).

Awards
In 2018, Hua was elevated to a Fellow of Institute of Electrical and Electronics Engineers for contributions to Facial Recognition in Images and Videos. In 2016, Hua was elected as a Fellow of International Association for Pattern Recognition for contributions to visual computing and learning from unconstrained images and videos and a Distinguished Scientist of Association for Computing Machinery for contributions to Multimedia and Computer Vision. He is the recipient of the 2015 IAPR Young Biometrics Investigator Award for contributions to Unconstrained Face Recognition in Images and Videos.

References 

1979 births
Living people
Chinese computer scientists
Microsoft people
Microsoft Research people
Fellow Members of the IEEE
Scientists from Hunan
Xi'an Jiaotong University alumni
Northwestern University alumni
Stevens Institute of Technology faculty
IBM people